No Time for Love Songs is the fourth studio album by American alternative country duo The Mastersons. It was released on March 6, 2020 under New West.

Critical reception
No Time for Love Songs was met with generally favorable reviews from critics. At Metacritic, which assigns a weighted average rating out of 100 to reviews from mainstream publications, this release received an average score of 79, based on 4 reviews.

Track listing

References

2020 albums
New West Records albums